Abdul Gaffar Biswas is a businessman and Jatiya Party (Ershad) politician and the former Member of Parliament of Khulna-3.

Career
Biswas was elected to parliament from Khulna-3 as a Jatiya Party candidate in 1988. He is currently President of Khulna KDA New Market's Owners Association, Khulna Divisional Fuel Distributors Association, Khulna Bus-Truck and Covered-Van Owners Association. His sons, Shible Biswas and Sohel Biswas, were arrested in September 2007 in Khulna City with unclear charges. He is the President of Khulna City unit of Jatiya Party and Vice Chairmen in central committee. In 2010, he was sued by Destiny Group for allegedly trying to extort them.

References

Jatiya Party politicians
Living people
4th Jatiya Sangsad members
1949 births